The Lebanese Third Division is the third division of Lebanese football. It is controlled by the Lebanese Football Association. It operates on a system of promotion and relegation with the Lebanese Second Division and Lebanese Fourth Division.

League table

Group A

Group B

Group C

Group D

Promotion play-offs

References 

Lebanese Third Division seasons
Lebanon
3
Lebanese Third Division, 2020-21